(8 May 1965 – 15 August 2018) was the pen name of a Japanese manga artist from Shimizu, Shizuoka Prefecture. She was best known as the creator of the long-running manga Chibi Maruko-chan.

Biography
Miki Miura, was born 8 May 1965. She revealed very little about her private life, including her real name.

Sakura made her debut as an artist in 1984 and the Chibi Maruko-chan was published in Ribon from 1986 to 1996. The series, which was based on her own childhood, was set in 1974 in suburban Japan. An anime series based on the Chibi Maruko-chan aired from 1990 to 1992 while the current second series, which debuted in 1995, continues to this day.

Sakura also made the more surreal fantasy series Coji-Coji, which ran from 1997 to 1999. She also worked with Marvelous Interactive on creating the Dreamcast title, Sakura Momoko Gekijō Coji-Coji, and with Nintendo on creating the Game Boy Advance title, Sakura Momoko no Ukiuki Carnival. In 2005, she designed the characters for the Xbox 360 title Every Party.

Music has often appeared in the work of Sakura, from the references of YMO in the early collections of Chibi Maruko-chan and the shout-outs to Shibuya-kei in the surreal world of Coji-Coji.

Death
Sakura died from breast cancer on August 15, 2018, at the age of 53. Before her death she wrote lyrics about musician Kazuyoshi Saito for him to sing. Saito used these for his 2019 song , an ending theme of the Chibi Maruko-chan anime.

Awards
In 1989, she received the Kodansha Manga Award for shōjo for Chibi Maruko-chan.

References

External links
 
 
 Profile at The Ultimate Manga Page 

1965 births
2018 deaths
Deaths from breast cancer
Deaths from cancer in Japan
Women manga artists
Manga artists from Shizuoka (city)
20th-century Japanese writers
21st-century Japanese writers
20th-century Japanese women writers
21st-century Japanese women writers
Female comics writers
Winner of Kodansha Manga Award (Shōjo)
Album-cover and concert-poster artists
Japanese female comics artists
Pseudonymous artists
Pseudonymous women writers
20th-century pseudonymous writers
21st-century pseudonymous writers